Endeavour Software Project Management is an open-source solution to manage large-scale enterprise software projects in an iterative and incremental development process.

History 

Endeavour Software Project Management was founded in September 2008 with the intention to develop a solution for replacing expensive and complex project management systems that is easy to use, intuitive, and realistic by eliminating features considered unnecessary.

In September 2009 the project was registered in SourceForge, and in April 2010 the project was included in  SourceForge's blog with an average of 210 weekly downloads.

Features
The major features include support for the following software artifacts:
 Projects
 Use cases
 Iterations
 Project plans
 Change requests
 Defect tracking
 Test cases
 Test plans
 Task
 Actors
 Document management
 Project glossary
 Project Wiki
 Developer management
 Reports (assignments, defects, cumulative flow)
 SVN browser integration with Svenson
 Continuous Integration  with Hudson
 Email notifications
 Fully internationalizable

System requirements 
Endeavour Software Project Management can be deployed in any Java EE-compliant application server and any relational database running under a variety of different operating systems.
Its cross-browser capability allows it to run in most popular web browsers.

Usage 

 Software project management
 Iterative and incremental development
 Use-case-driven
 Issue tracking
 Test-case management software
 Integrated wiki

See also 

 Project management software
 List of project management software

Notes

References
 Lee Schlesinger. Social media specialist at SourceForge.net blog post about Endeavour Software Project Management
 http://www.softpedia.com/get/Programming/Coding-languages-Compilers/Endeavour-Software-Project-Management.shtml
 http://freshmeat.net/projects/endeavour-software-project-management
 https://web.archive.org/web/20100504041659/http://www.federalarchitect.com/2009/07/21/new-open-source-project-management-tool-for-large-scale-enterprise-systems/

External links
 
 http://sourceforge.net/projects/endeavour-mgmt/reviews

Software project management
Software requirements
Bug and issue tracking software
Software development process
Free software programmed in Java (programming language)
Free project management software